Jocenir Alves da Silva (born February 14, 1989 in Caçapava do Sul), known as just Jocenir, is a Brazilian footballer who plays as an attacking midfielder for Canadian Soccer Club in the Uruguayan Segunda División Amateur.

External links
 Profile at soccerway
 Profile at ceroacero
 Stats at footballdatabase.eu

1989 births
Living people
Brazilian footballers
Porto Alegre Futebol Clube players
Central Español players
Association football midfielders
Canadian Soccer Club players